Patar (also Romanized as Patār and Petār; also known as Patr) is a village in Negur Rural District, Dashtiari District, Chabahar County, Sistan and Baluchestan Province, Iran. At the 2006 census, its population was 790, in 147 families.

References 

Populated places in Chabahar County